The 1976 United States presidential election in Oklahoma took place on November 2, 1976, as part of the 1976 United States presidential election. All fifty states and the District of Columbia participated in the election. Oklahoma voters chose eight electors to the Electoral College, who voted for president and vice president.

Oklahoma was won by incumbent President Gerald Ford (R) by a narrow margin of 1.21 percent. Despite Ford’s narrow victory, Oklahoma is a reliably Republican state, and the last Democratic presidential candidate to carry the state was Lyndon Johnson in 1964.

, this is the last election in which a Democrat carried one of the three counties in the Oklahoma Panhandle, namely Cimarron County, as well as the last time Grant County, Jackson County, Rogers County, Adair County, Dewey County, Roger Mills County, Lincoln County, Creek County, Grady County, Logan County, McClain County, Pottawatomie County, and Wagoner County voted for a Democratic presidential candidate. Carter's 532,442 votes is the most received by a Democratic presidential candidate in the state's history.

Oklahoma, a very socially conservative state, had last voted for a Democratic presidential nominee in 1964, but Democrats maintained a large advantage in party registration and in the state legislature in this era. Going into election day, ABC News rated the state as a tossup between Democratic Georgia Governor Jimmy Carter and Republican President Gerald Ford.

On Election Day, the Sooner State voted for Ford by a narrow margin of 1.21% or 13,266 votes. Oklahoma was one of only two states in the South, the other being Virginia, to vote for Ford. Despite Carter’s rural appeal in socially conservative Little Dixie, Ford ran up large margins in Tulsa and Oklahoma counties. Without those two counties, Carter would have won the state by nearly ten percentage points.

Results

Results by county

See also
 United States presidential elections in Oklahoma

References

Oklahoma
1976
1976 Oklahoma elections